The Luxembourg national korfball team was managed by the Federation Luxembourgeoise du Korfball (FLKB), representing Luxembourg in korfball international competitions. Currently there are no teams in Luxembourg

Tournament history

Current squad
National team in the 2009 European Bowl

 Coach: Laurent Schussler

References

External links
 Federation Luxembourgeoise du Korfball

National korfball teams
Korfball
National team